EEC is the European Economic Community, a regional organisation that existed from 1958 to 1993.

EEC may also refer to:

 Eastern Economic Corridor, Thailand
 East European Craton
 Easwari Engineering College, in Chennai, India
 Ectrodactyly–ectodermal dysplasia–cleft syndrome
 Embodied embedded cognition
 Enterprise Electronics Corporation, an American weather radar company
 Eswatini Electricity Company, the national electricity supplier in Eswatini
 Eurasian Economic Commission, the regulatory body of the Eurasian Economic Union
 Eurasian Economic Community, an international organisation that existed from 2000 to 2014
 European Energy Centre
 European Energy Community, the former name for the Energy Community
 Extended Error Correction, a RAM parity feature
 Ford EEC, a series of engine control units
 Electronic engine control, an element of a full authority digital engine control